Kalya is an Israeli settlement organized as a kibbutz in the West Bank. It was originally established in 1929  but was occupied and destroyed by the Jordanians in 1948; it was later rebuilt in 1968 after the Six-Day War. Located on the northern shore of the Dead Sea, 360 meters below sea level, it falls under the jurisdiction of Megilot Regional Council.

The international community considers Israeli settlements in the West Bank illegal under international law, but the Israeli government disputes this.

Etymology
The name Kalya is derived from kalium, the Latin name for potassium, a chemical found in abundance in the region. Kalya is also a Hebrew acronym for "קם לתחייה ים המוות" (Kam Litkhiya Yam HaMavet), literally, the Dead Sea has returned to life.

History

The kibbutz was first established during the British Mandate era. Moshe Novomeysky, a Jewish engineer from Siberia, won the British government tender for potash mining on the Dead Sea's northern shore, the marshland surrounding the plant was drained and housing was built to accommodate employees of the Palestine Potash Company. The company, chartered in 1929, set up its first plant on the north shore of the Dead Sea at Kalya and produced potash, or potassium chloride, by solar evaporation of the brine. It employed both Arabs and Jews.

Kalya was spared violence in the 1936–39 Arab revolt due to good relations with the Arabs; the plant employed many Arab laborers from Jericho. Despite negotiations between the kibbutz leadership and Jordan's Arab Legion to preserve the kibbutz under Jordanian control at the time of the 1948 Arab–Israeli War, the imprisonment of Jews in the Jordanian-held Naharayim complex and the Kfar Etzion massacre led David Ben-Gurion to call for the residents' evacuation and their consolidation in the southern Dead Sea. Residents of Kalya and nearby Beit HaArava ultimately fled by boat on 20 May 1948, and the two kibbutzim were destroyed by the Jordanians. The area remained unpopulated save a Jordanian military camp.

Following Israel's occupation of the West Bank from Jordan in the 1967 Six-Day War, Kalya was re-established as a paramilitary Nahal settlement in 1968, the first in the area. Civilians temporarily settled in the deserted Jordanian army camp in 1972 while planting the first date palms and building permanent houses. The completed homes were populated in 1974.

According to ARIJ, Israel expropriated 955 dunums of land in 1968 from the Palestinian village of as-Sawahira ash-Sharqiya in order to construct Kalya.

Status under international law
Like all Israeli settlements in the Israeli-occupied territories, Kalya is considered illegal under international law, though Israel disputes this. The international community considers Israeli settlements to violate the Fourth Geneva Convention's prohibition on the transfer of an occupying power's civilian population into occupied territory. Israel disputes that the Fourth Geneva Convention applies to the Palestinian territories as they had not been legally held by a sovereign prior to Israel taking control of them. This view has been rejected by the International Court of Justice and the International Committee of the Red Cross.

Economy
Kalya has a population of 300 and depends mainly on agriculture, primarily consisting of dairy farming and raising date palms, watermelons and cherry tomatoes. The kibbutz also runs the Israel Nature and Parks Authority visitor's centre of the nearby Qumran Caves, where the Dead Sea Scrolls were found. At one time, the kibbutz operated a water park.

The kibbutz serves as a rest stop between Jerusalem and Ein Gedi due to its proximity to the Beit HaArava Junction between Highway 90 and Highway 1.

Beach

A private beach run by the kibbutz is popular with Israelis, Christian pilgrims and tourists. The wooden building near the seashore where people can drink, eat and chat is rightly called the lowest bar in the world (–417), some lower of the entrance one. Since the easing of travel restrictions in the West Bank and the removal of major roadblocks, Palestinians also come to swim there. However, Palestinians were regularly barred from reaching any Dead Sea beaches for fear that Arab presence would cause loss of Jewish customers for establishments along the shore. This was enforced by the Israeli military at Beit Ha'arava checkpoint on Route 90.

References

External links
 Official website 

Israeli settlements in the West Bank
Kibbutzim
Kibbutz Movement
Non-religious Israeli settlements
Populated places established in 1929
1929 establishments in Mandatory Palestine
Populated places established in 1968
1968 establishments in the Israeli Military Governorate
Jewish villages depopulated during the 1948 Arab–Israeli War
Nahal settlements